is a song by Garnet Crow, which was released as one of their two debut singles - which they released on the same day, March 29, 2000, after being signed record label Giza Studio. Arrangement of the title track on this single is significantly more mellow than what was on their indies album and is the version that they have released on subsequent albums and performed in concerts. The single charted #40 rank for first week.

Track listing
All tracks are composed by Yuri Nakamura, written by Nana Azuki and arranged by Hirohito Furui.
Kimi no uchi ni tsuku made zutto hashitte yuku (君の家に着くまでずっと走ってゆく)
in little time
Kimi no uchi ni tsuku made zutto hashitte yuku (君の家に着くまでずっと走ってゆく) (instrumental)

References

External links
 GARNET CROW's official website
 GIZA studio's website

2000 singles
Garnet Crow songs
Giza Studio singles
2000 songs
Songs with lyrics by Nana Azuki
Song recordings produced by Daiko Nagato